Palaquium herveyi is a tree in the family Sapotaceae.

Description
The bark is reddish brown. Inflorescences bear up to six brownish flowers.

Distribution and habitat
Palaquium herveyi is native to Peninsular Malaysia and Borneo. Its habitat is mixed dipterocarp forests.

Conservation
Palaquium herveyi has been assessed as near threatened on the IUCN Red List. The species is threatened by logging and conversion of forest land to palm oil plantations.

References

herveyi
Plants described in 1906
Trees of Peninsular Malaysia
Trees of Borneo